Mossley (/ˈmɒzli/) is a town and civil parish in Tameside, Greater Manchester, England, in the upper Tame Valley and the foothills of the Pennines,  southeast of Oldham and  east of Manchester.

The historic counties of Lancashire, Cheshire and the West Riding of Yorkshire meet in Mossley and local government wards and church parishes correspond to their boundaries. Mossley had a population of 10,921 at the 2011 Census. It is the only parished area of Tameside, having had a parish council since 1999.

History

Toponymy
Believed to originate in around 1319, the name Mossley means "a woodland clearing by a swamp or bog".

Events
Mossley—alongside neighbouring Stalybridge and Uppermill in Saddleworth—helped launch the annual Whit Friday Band Contest, an internationally known brass band event. This came about when the three towns held unconnected brass band events on 6 June 1884.

Public venue
George Lawton, the son of magistrate and alderman John Lawton, inherited a family fortune and when he died in August 1949, he left the bulk of his wealth to the people of Mossley. Part of his £77,760 wealth was left to build a public meeting place, the George Lawton Hall.

Notable people
Ernest Sykes, recipient of the Victoria Cross
Melanie Sykes, TV presenter and model
John Mayall, Mill Owner and owner of the largest cotton spinning company in the world (1803–1878)
Jon Courtenay, Britain's Got Talent winner in 2020
 Lee Broadbent and Eoghan Clifford, - members of the hard rock band Cabbage
 Ray Hill, anti-fascist

Governance

Following the passing of the Public Health Act 1848 and the Local Government Act 1857, a Local Board of Health was established in Mossley in 1864. On 13 March 1885 Mossley was granted a Charter of Incorporation to become a municipal borough, replacing the local board. The whole borough was unified under the administrative county of Lancashire under the Local Government Act 1888. In 1974 the borough of Mossley was absorbed under the provisions of the Local Government Act 1972 into the new metropolitan borough of Tameside in the metropolitan county of Greater Manchester. It became an unparished area.

Under the provisions of the Local Government and Rating Act 1997 local electors were given the right to request that a new parish and council be created in unparished areas. The people of Mossley exercised this right and a civil parish for Mossley was established in 1999. The civil parish council voted to adopt town status and Mossley now has a town mayor. The town has three parish wards based on the historic county borders, with four members representing the Cheshire part, three members the Lancashire part and two members the Yorkshire part. The town's unofficial coat of arms includes Cheshire's sheaf of corn, Lancashire's red rose and Yorkshire's white rose to signify the historic demarcation.

Parliament
From 1918 to 1950 the town gave its name to the Mossley constituency which returned a Member of Parliament; for most of the period, the MP was Austin Hopkinson, who was notable for being elected as an Independent candidate. The town is now represented by the MP for Stalybridge and Hyde.

Geography

Mossley lies amongst the foothills of the Pennines, on the western edge of Saddleworth Moor.

Churches

The eccesiastical parishes correspond to the boundaries of the historic counties: St. Joseph's Church in the centre of Mossley is Roman Catholic
All Saints' Church is in Micklehurst, Cheshire.
St John the Baptist Church is of Yorkshire.
St George's Church is of Lancashire.

Education

Primary schools
St. Joseph's R.C. Primary School
Livingstone Primary School
St. George's Primary School
Milton St. John's Primary School
All Saints Micklehurst

Secondary school
Mossley Hollins High School

Transport
The town is served by Mossley railway station. Several bus routes serve Mossley, including the 350 operated by FirstGroup and the 356, operated by Nexus Move, which operate routes between Ashton-under-Lyne, Uppermill and Oldham. The town is also served by the 343, operated by Stotts, travelling between Hyde and Oldham. This is the only bus route to connect nearby Carrbrook to Mossley.

A tram network operated by the SHMD Joint Board ran lines through Mossley from 1904 to 1945, until their replacement by buses. The second-generation tramway Manchester Metrolink currently terminates at nearby Ashton-under-Lyne for connections to the city centre.

Twinning
Mossley's French twin town is Hem, situated near Lille, in the Nord département.

Sport
Local sport teams include Mossley A.F.C., Mossley Mayhem Softball Club, Mossley Athletic JFC, Mossley Juniors F.C., Mossley AFC Running Club and Micklehurst Cricket Club.

Fairtrade
Mossley's Town Council passed a resolution in November 2009 to make Mossley a Fairtrade Town. A group of local campaigners and activist have started the Fairtrade Mossley group to make 2010 the year that Mossley becomes a Fairtrade Town.

Culture 
Peter McGarr - British Award winning composer, lives in Mossley.
Chris Cyprus - artist

See also

Listed buildings in Mossley

References

External links

Mossleyweb, The Original Official Mossley AFC Website
Mossley Council - Mossley Town Council's Web Site
MossleyOnline, Mossley's Interactive Online Community
Welcome to Mossley, History and Photo Guide to Mossley
Tameside Council - Mossley Coat of Arms
Mossley Hollins High School
Mossley Business Association - Supporting Mossley's Businesses

Towns in Greater Manchester
Civil parishes in Greater Manchester
Towns and villages of the Peak District
Geography of Tameside